The Municipality of Mirna is a municipality in the traditional region of Lower Carniola in southeastern Slovenia. The seat of the municipality is the town of Mirna. Mirna became a municipality in 2011.

Settlements
In addition to the municipal seat of Mirna, the municipality also includes the following settlements:

 Brezovica pri Mirni
 Cirnik
 Debenec
 Glinek
 Gomila
 Gorenja Vas pri Mirni
 Migolica
 Migolska Gora
 Praprotnica
 Ravne
 Sajenice
 Selo pri Mirni
 Selska Gora
 Ševnica
 Škrjanče
 Stan
 Stara Gora
 Trbinc
 Volčje Njive
 Zabrdje
 Zagorica

History
Mirna was a municipality before World War II. After the war, it was a municipality from the establishment of municipalities in Slovenia in 1952 until 1959, when the Municipality of Mirna merged with the Municipality of Trebnje.

In November 2009, residents of the parish of Mirna voted in a referendum in support of secession from the Municipality of Trebnje and the establishment of an independent municipality, but the act enacting this was rejected in April 2010 by the National Assembly, mainly because it also included the establishment of the Municipality of Ankaran.

On February 1, 2011, the National Assembly passed another act on the establishment of the Municipality of Mirna. That happened after the Constitutional Court of Slovenia had ordered the National Assembly in December 2010 to establish the Municipality of Mirna within two months and to call the election to its municipal council within 20 days after the establishment. Mirna regained its status as a municipality on February 26, 2011.

References

External links

Municipality of Mirna on Geopedia
Mirna municipal site

 
Mirna
2011 establishments in Slovenia